Rangapur may refer to:

 Rangapur, Kapilvastu, a village in Kapilvastu district in Lumbini, Nepal
 Rangapur, Rautahat, a village in  Rautahat district in Narayani, Nepal
 Rangapur, Belgaum, a village in Belgaum district of Karnataka, India
 Rangapur, Nalgonda district, a village in Nalgonda district of Telangana, India
 Rangapur, Manchal mandal, a village in Ranga Reddy district of Telangana, India
 Rangapur, Shabad mandal, a village in Ranga Reddy district of Andhra Pradesh, India

See also 
 Rangpur (disambiguation)